Arzoo may refer to:

Arts and entertainment

Films 
 Arzoo (1942 film), a Bollywood film
 Arzoo (1950 film), starring Dilip Kumar
 Arzoo (1965 film), starring Rajendra Kumar
 Aarzoo, 1999 film starring Akshay Kumar, Madhuri Dixit and Saif Ali Khan

Television 
 Arzoo Hai Tu, 2003 Indian television series which aired on Sahara One

Fictional characters 
 Aarzoo, character played by Amrita Puri in Blood Money
 Aarzoo, character played by Rakul Preet Singh in Marjaavaan

People 
 Arzoo Govitrikar, Indian model and actress